Avik Mukhopadhyay is an Indian cinematographer who works in Bengali and Hindi films. He collaborated with eminent directors like Mrinal Sen, Aparna Sen, Rituparno Ghosh, Srijit Mukherji, Kamaleshwar Mukherjee, Anik Dutta, Aniruddha Roy Chowdhury, Shoojit Sircar and Sujoy Ghosh. Some of his most notable works include Chokher Bali, Patalghar, Bhalo Theko, Raincoat, Dosar, The Last Lear, Antaheen, Chitrangada: The Crowning Wish, October and Sardar Udham. He is the recipient of the National Film Award for Best Cinematography three times and the Filmfare Award for Best Cinematographer once. He studied the cinematography at the Film and television Institute of India.

Filmography

As Cinematographer

Awards and nominations

National Film Awards

Filmfare Awards

IIFA Awards

References

External links
 

Bengali film cinematographers
Living people
University of Calcutta alumni
Best Cinematography National Film Award winners
Cinematographers from West Bengal
Year of birth missing (living people)
Filmfare Awards winners